Lygna or Lyngdalselva is a river in Agder county, Norway. The  river runs from the mountains in northern Hægebostad municipality, through the Lyngdalen valley to the municipality of Lyngdal to its mouth at Alleen, where it runs into Lyngdalsfjorden. The river is called the Storåni north of the lake Lygne. The river passes the villages of Tingvatn, Snartemo, and Kvås as well as the town of Lyngdal.

References

Rivers of Agder
Hægebostad
Lyngdal
Rivers of Norway